Lifouta is a town in southeastern Gabon.

Transport
It is served by a station on the national railway network.

See also
 Railway stations in Gabon

References

Populated places in Ogooué-Lolo Province